The BT-43 was a Finnish fully tracked transport vehicle prototype, designed during the Second World War. It was developed from the Soviet-made BT-7 tank, which had been captured in large quantities during the Winter War and early Continuation War.

History 
In May 1943, a request was made for a fully tracked transport vehicle capable of carrying 20 men. It was decided to convert some obsolete BT series into BT-43 carriers. The prototype was not a great success and no further development took place. The BT-43 appeared clumsy and with a high profile. The turret was removed, and a wooden platform was located on the modified hull.

See also 
BT-42

World War II military equipment of Finland